USS Suncook is a name used more than once by the U.S. Navy:

 , an American Civil War steamer.
 , a net laying ship serving during World War II and later with the U.S. Bureau of Mines.

References 

United States Navy ship names